Tollywood may refer to:
 Tollywood (Bengali cinema), the Bengali-language film industry based in West Bengal.
 Tollygunge, the locality of Kolkata, West Bengal, India where the Bengali film industry (Tollywood) is based
 Tollywood (Telugu cinema), the Telugu-language film industry based in Telangana and Andhra Pradesh
 Film Nagar (Tollywood), the film district of Hyderabad, Telangana, India

See also

 Hollywood (disambiguation)

 Tolly
 Wood (disambiguation)
 Bollywood